Starovo is a rural locality (a village) in Pershinskoye Rural Settlement, Kirzhachsky District, Vladimir Oblast, Russia. The population was 37 as of 2010. There are 3 streets.

Geography 
Starovo is located 19 km south of Kirzhach (the district's administrative centre) by road. Sanino is the nearest rural locality.

References 

Rural localities in Kirzhachsky District